Miss Universe Malaysia 2018, the 52nd edition of the Miss Universe Malaysia, was held on 11 January 2018 at the Majestic Araneta Auditorium, Kuala Lumpur. Jane Teoh of Penang was crowned by the outgoing titleholder, Samantha James of Kuala Lumpur at the end of the event. She then represented Malaysia at the Miss Universe 2018 pageant in Bangkok, Thailand.

Results

Gala Night Judges 

 Dato’ Sri Navneet Goenka - Founder & Vice President of CERES Jewels
 Dato’ Hans Isaac - Malaysian actor, Writer, Director and Producer
 Miko Au - Founder of Miko Gelere, Celebrity Hairstylist
 Levy Li - Miss Universe Malaysia 2008
 Lau Sook Phing - General Manager of L’Oréal Luxe Malaysia
 Datin Selwinder Kaur - Chief Operating Officer of Glojas Health Clinic 
 Kiriat Argenio - Director of Marketing Zalora Malaysia
 Nuraliza Othman - National Director of Miss Singapore, Miss Universe Singapore 2002
 Deborah Henry - Miss Universe Malaysia 2011

Special awards

Contestants
Official 18 Finalists of Miss Universe Malaysia 2018.

Color Key

Top 50 
The Top 50 contestants was announced via Miss Universe Malaysia official page on 8 September 2017.
 The contestant that was chosen as official candidate.

Crossovers 
Contestants who previously competed/appeared at other national beauty pageants:

Miss Universe Malaysia
 2017 - Kirsten Wong Yee Mun (Top 50)
 2017 - Mellisa Wong Yi Sheong (Top 50)

Miss World Malaysia
 2019 - Alexis Sue-Ann (Winner)
 2018 - Shannen Jade Totten (1st Runner-up)
 2015  - Natasha Aprillia Jalius Benggon (4th Runner-up)

Miss International Malaysia
 2019 - Charmaine Chew (Winner)

Miss Grand Malaysia
 2020 - Jasebel Shalani Robert (Winner)
 2019 - Lysandra Gabriel Storie (Top 12)
 2017 - Maria Devonne Escobia (Top 7)

Miss Grand Kuala Lumpur
 2017 - Maria Devonne Escobia (2nd Runner-up)

Miss Grand Sarawak
 2019 - Lysandra Gabriel Storie (1st Runner-up)
 2017 - Lysandra Gabriel Storie (5th Runner-up)

The Face of M.O Sarawak
 2017 - Jessy Gantle (Winner)

Dewi Idola Berkarisma 
 2017 - Jessy Gantle (Finalists Top 15)

The Face of Beauty International
 2016 - Jane Teoh Jun (Top 10)

The Face of Beauty International Malaysia
 2016 - Jane Teoh Jun (Winner)

Miss Iban London Qualifiers of Borneo Hornbill Festival
 2016 - Jessy Gantle (2nd Runner-up)

Miss Malaysia Kebaya Sarawak 
 2016 - Jessy Gantle (Top 14)

Unduk Ngadau
 2015 - Natasha Aprillia Jalius Benggon (Top 7)

Unduk Ngadau Inanam
 2015 - Natasha Aprillia Jalius Benggon (Winner)

Miss Cultural Harvest Festival 
 2015 - Jessy Gantle (Finalists Top 16)

Miss Earth Malaysia
 2014 - Natasha Aprillia Jalius Benggon (3rd Runner-up)

Miss Earth Sabah
 2014 - Natasha Aprillia Jalius Benggon (1st Runner-up)

Puteri Samarahan
 2014 - Jessy Gantle (Winner)

Ratu Kebaya 1Malaysia
 2012 - Jessy Gantle (Top 12)

See also
 Bachelor of Malaysia
 List of Malaysian representatives at international male beauty pageants

References

External links 
 

2018 in Malaysia
2018 beauty pageants
2018